The 2nd constituency of Veszprém County is one of the single member constituencies of the National Assembly, the national legislature of Hungary. The constituency standard abbreviation: Veszprém 02. OEVK.

Since 2014, it has been represented by Károly Kontrát of the Fidesz–KDNP party alliance.

Geography
The 2nd constituency is located in south-eastern part of Veszprém County.

List of municipalities
The constituency includes the following municipalities:

Members
The constituency was first represented by Károly Kontrát of the Fidesz from 2014, and he was re-elected in 2018.

References

Veszprém 2nd